Regen is a Landkreis (district) in Bavaria, Germany. It is bounded by (from the south and clockwise) the districts of Freyung-Grafenau, Deggendorf, Straubing-Bogen and Cham, and by the Czech Republic (Plzeň Region).

History
The district was established in 1972 by merging the former districts of Regen and Viechtach.

Geography

The district is entirely located in the Bavarian Forest. It is named after the Regen river and its two headstreams, the Black Regen and the White Regen.

Coat of arms
The coat of arms displays:
 the blue and white checked pattern of Bavaria
 a glass, symbolising the glass industry
 a pine tree, symbolising the Bavarian Forest
 a tower, symbolising the castles in the district

Towns and municipalities

References

External links

Official website (German)

 
Districts of Bavaria